Mörön is a sum (district) of Khentii Province in eastern Mongolia. The Chandgana Tal coal mine is 25 km E from 
Mörön sum center. In 2010, its population was 1,326.

References 

Districts of Khentii Province